The 2021 Silicon Valley Classic (also known as the Mubadala Silicon Valley Classic for sponsorship reasons) was a professional tennis tournament played on hard courts. It was the 49th edition of the tournament, and part of the WTA Premier tournaments of the 2021 WTA Tour. It took place between 2 and 8 August 2021 in San Jose, California. It was the first women's event on the 2021 US Open Series.

Champions

Singles

 Danielle Collins def.  Daria Kasatkina, 6–3, 6–7(10–12), 6–1

Doubles

 Darija Jurak /  Andreja Klepač def.  Gabriela Dabrowski /  Luisa Stefani, 6−1, 7−5

Points and prize money

Point distribution

Prize money

Singles main-draw entrants

Seeds

 Rankings are as of July 26, 2021.

Other entrants
The following players received wildcards into the main draw:
  Claire Liu
  Emma Raducanu

The following player received entry using a protected ranking:
  CoCo Vandeweghe

The following players received entry from the qualifying draw:
  Emina Bektas
  Han Na-lae
  Ana Konjuh
  Lesley Pattinama Kerkhove

Withdrawals
Before the tournament
  Ekaterina Alexandrova → replaced by  Kristina Mladenovic
  Paula Badosa → replaced by  Caroline Garcia
  Sofia Kenin → replaced by  Marie Bouzková
  Veronika Kudermetova → replaced by  Caty McNally 
  Karolína Muchová → replaced by  Donna Vekić
  Jeļena Ostapenko → replaced by  Anastasija Sevastova

Doubles main-draw entrants

Seeds

1 Rankings are as of 26 July 2021.

Other entrants
The following pairs received wildcards into the doubles main draw:
  Makenna Jones /  Elizabeth Scotty
  Ashlyn Krueger /  Robin Montgomery

The following pair received entry as a alternates:
  Peyton Stearns /  Maribella Zamarripa

Withdrawals
Before the tournament
  Marie Bouzková /  Lucie Hradecká → replaced by  Peyton Stearns /  Maribella Zamarripa
  Chan Hao-ching /  Latisha Chan → replaced by  Elixane Lechemia /  Ingrid Neel
  Desirae Krawczyk /  Bethanie Mattek-Sands → replaced by  Emina Bektas /  Tara Moore
  Sania Mirza /  Asia Muhammad → replaced by  Erin Routliffe /  Aldila Sutjiadi

References

External links
Official website

2021 WTA Tour
2021
Sports in San Jose, California
Tennis tournaments in California
2021 in sports in California
2021 in American tennis
August 2021 sports events in the United States
2021 US Open Series